List of international financial institutions:

African Development Bank
Asian Development Bank
Asian Infrastructure Investment Bank
Bank for International Settlements
Black Sea Trade and Development Bank
Caribbean Development Bank
Eurasian Development Bank
European Bank for Reconstruction and Development
European Investment Bank
Islamic Development Bank
Preferential Trade Area Bank
World Bank Group
International Bank for Reconstruction and Development (IBRD)
International Development Association (IDA)
International Finance Corporation (IFC)
Multilateral Investment Guarantee Agency (MIGA)
International Centre for Settlement of Investment Disputes (ICSID)

See also
 List of banks in Africa
 List of banks in the Americas
 List of banks in Asia
 List of banks in Europe
 List of banks in Oceania
 Central bank
 Commercial bank
 Co-operative bank
 Credit union
 Investment bank
 Land development bank

References

International